The 2000 Wisconsin Badgers football team represented the University of Wisconsin in the 2000 NCAA Division I-A football season.

Schedule

Roster

Regular starters

Rankings

2001 NFL Draft

Awards and records
Kevin Stemke, Punter,	Ray Guy Award 
Jamar Fletcher, Cornerback, Jim Thorpe Award
Jamar Fletcher, Cornerback, Big Ten Defensive Player of the Year

References

Wisconsin
Wisconsin Badgers football seasons
Sun Bowl champion seasons
Wisconsin Badgers football